Poland Center is an unincorporated community in Mahoning County, in the U.S. state of Ohio.

History
A schoolhouse was built at Poland Center as early as 1833. A post office called Poland Centre was established in 1852, and remained in operation until 1858.

References

Unincorporated communities in Mahoning County, Ohio
1833 establishments in Ohio
Populated places established in 1833
Unincorporated communities in Ohio